Route 283 is a 73 km (?) two-lane north/south highway in the Chaudière-Appalaches region in the province of Quebec, Canada. Its northern terminus is in Montmagny at the junction of Route 132 and its southern terminus is close to Saint-Lucie-de-Beauregard at the junction of Route 204.

Towns along Route 283

 Montmagny
 Notre-Dame-du-Rosaire
 Saint-Fabien-de-Panet
 Lac-Frontière
 Sainte-Lucie-de-Beauregard

See also
 List of Quebec provincial highways

References

External links 
 Provincial Route Map (Courtesy of the Quebec Ministry of Transportation) 
 Route 283 on Google Maps

283
Roads in Chaudière-Appalaches